Earl Evans may refer to:

Earl Evans (American football) (1900–1991), American football player
Earl Evans (scientist) (1910–1999), chairman of the biochemistry department at the University of Chicago
Earl Evans (basketball) (1955–2012), American basketball player
Earl Evans (musician)
Earl Evans Jr., politician in Mississippi